Cresera ilus is a moth of the family Erebidae first described by Pieter Cramer in 1776. It is found in French Guiana, Suriname, Guyana, Ecuador, Peru and the Brazilian state of Amazonas.

References

Moths described in 1776
Phaegopterina
Taxa named by Pieter Cramer